Old Romance is the debut studio album by Nigerian singer-songwriter Tekno, it was released on 10 December 2020 by Island Records, and The Cartel Entertainment. 
The album combines elements from R&B, and Afropop with Neo-soul percussive rhythms. Old Romance received favorable reviews from critics, as Motolani Alake for Pulse Nigeria said "As a producer and multi-instrumentalist, Tekno has an uncanny understanding of music and sounds"

Background
Tekno recorded Old Romance after series of hit songs, collaborations and appearance on various events.
On November 15, 2020, Tekno teased fans about the release of his debut album Old Romance.

Composition
The album opening track “Sku Sku” clears the air on Tekno's vocal chord and the smoothness of his range, while delivering a love song that is as emotional as it is honest.
In “Enjoy”, the project lead single boasts all of Tekno's trademark, and is the albums's centrepiece backed by an the ethereal but groovy Blaise Beats-produced beat. 
Its Afrobeat-inspired instrumental is a vibe. It rolls off Tekno's tongue with a smoothness that puts him in a class of his own.
In “Uptown Girl”, Tekno expresses the emotive record, where he reminisce on a love come up and how she mean to him. The a sweet ballad sees Tekno reflecting about his love with onomatopoeia sounds.
Old Romance has its moments of brilliance. 'Armaggedon,' 'Catalia,' 'Family Issues,' 'Designer,' and 'Mistakes' are examples of records with immediate resonance and deliberate shock value.

Critical reception

Old Romance received mixed reviews from music critics. In review for Mp3bullet praised the project for often bring a temporal rush of excitement to the fans, and added it on mentions of top 10 best album of 2020.
In review for Rolling Stone, they wrote that ‘Old Romance is by far the most promising thing Tekno has done since “Pana” (The circular guitar figures in the new track “Dana” even evoke that older hit.) “Neighbour” is joined by tracks like “Uptown Girl” and “Catalia,” which effectively merge Tekno's yearning and flirting with lithe, zippy beats.”
In Review for Pulse Nigeria, Motolani Alake said "Kudos to Tekno's A&R, who tries to find a conceptual nexus/central theme for this album. It ties into Tekno's strengths as an artist, He has never been the greatest storyteller, neither has his music ever been about astute songwriting. What he excels on has always been his ability to produce the appropriate bits of onomatopeia, vibes and social media bars that make songs resonate. He's the bridge between Wizkid and Kizz Daniel“

Track listing

Personnel
Augustine Miles Kelechi - Primary artist, writer.
Killertunez -  Production (track 1)
Spax - Production (track 2, 3, 5, 7, 8)
Clemzy - Production (track 9)
Benjams - Production (track 10, 14)
Blaize Beatz- Production (track 11, 12)
Zaki Beatz - Production (tracks 6)
Phantom - Production (tracks 4)
Wise Don - Production (track 13)

Release history

References

2020 debut albums
Albums produced by Tekno